Trocken, German for dry, is a classification of German wine that indicates a wine that is dry rather than off-dry (halbtrocken), sweeter (lieblich) or sweet (süß). Trocken wines are not devoid of residual sugar, but have, at most, a few grams per liter, which can be perceptible but is not overtly sweet. Trocken is also a designation for Austrian wine, but more rarely used there than in Germany, since many quality categories of Austrian wines are dry by default.

Somewhat confusingly, for Sekt and other sparkling wines, trocken indicates a higher level of sugar than it does for non-sparkling wines. A Sekt trocken is best described as off-dry or semi-sweet, while a Sekt brut is completely dry.

Requirements

The maximum amount of sugar allowed for a trocken designation depends on the level of acid in the wine. For wine low in acid, a maximum of  sugar is allowed. Most high-quality German white wines have a high enough acidity to be allowed up to 9 grams per liter of sugar under the trocken level. When used, the requirements in Austria are exactly the same.

Sparkling wines
This parallels the term sec ("dry") in French, which indicates a sparkling wine of the same sugar level as trocken.

Background
Until the invention of sterile filtration, most German wines were dry. Fermentation continued until all the sugar was consumed, leaving only miscellaneous unfermentable sugars. Only the occasional sweet rarity, made from extremely ripe grapes, kept any residual sugar. For most of the twentieth century, the style was typically sweeter low-alcohol wines. Only since about 1990 has trocken wine become popular, partly because many prefer it with food. Most exported German wine is still of the sweeter styles. While it appears in the term trockenbeerenauslese, trocken in that case refers to the dried grapes, not the dryness of the resulting wine.

References

German wine
Wine classification
German words and phrases